Bolton is an English surname. Notable people with the surname include:

Academics
 Andrew Bolton (curator) (born 1966), British museum curator
 Geoffrey Bolton (1931–2015), Australian academic historian
 Herbert Eugene Bolton (1870–1953), American historian and professor
 Jim Bolton (historian), English medieval economic historian
 Robert Bolton (1572–1631), English clergyman and academic
 Samuel Bolton (1606–1654), English clergyman and scholar

Art
 Clarence Bolton (1893–1962), American painter and lithographer
 Constance Bolton (née Beard, 1884–1949), New Zealand painter
 William Jay Bolton (1816–1884), English-American designer and manufacturer of stained glass windows

Banking and finance
 Anthony Bolton (born 1950), British investment fund manager and investor
 Frederic Bolton (1851–1920), English shipowner and underwriter
 James C. Bolton (1899–1974), American banker in Louisiana; son of James W. Bolton
 James W. Bolton (1869–1936), American banker in Louisiana; son of George Washington Bolton, father of James C. Bolton

Entertainment
 Betty Bolton (1906–2005), British actress
 Emily Bolton (born 1951), Dutch actress
 Joe Bolton (television personality) (1910–1986), American radio and television personality
 John Bolton (actor) (born 1965), American actor
 Marc Bolton (born 1968), English actor
 Mary Catherine Bolton (1790/91–1830), English actress, later known as Lady Thurlow
 Michael Bolton (born 1953), American singer
 Roger Bolton (producer) (born 1945), British television producer and radio presenter
 Zach Bolton (born 1981), American director, producer, and voice actor

Military
 Cecil H. Bolton (1908–1965), United States Army colonel and Medal of Honor recipient
 Claude M. Bolton Jr. (1945–2015), American Air Force Major General
 Daniel Bolton (1793–1860), English military engineer
 Edward L. Bolton, United States Air Force major general
 Francis Bolton (1831–1887), British Army officer and engineer
 William Bolton (Royal Navy officer, died 1817), captain in the Royal Navy
 William Bolton (Royal Navy officer, died 1830) (1777–1830), post-captain in the Royal Navy
 William Compton Bolton (died 1849), English-born officer in the United States Navy
 William Kinsey Bolton (1861–1941), Australian soldier and politician

Music
 Dupree Bolton (1929–1993), American jazz trumpeter
 Ivor Bolton (born 1958), English conductor and harpsichordist
 Steve Bolton (born 1949), English rock musician, also known as Boltz
 Tangelene Bolton (born 1991), American composer and music producer

Politics and law

Australia
 Alexander Bolton (1847–1918), Australian politician
 Elizabeth Bolton (born 1950), Australian lawyer, judge and magistrate
 Harry Bolton (1870–1956), Australian politician in the Western Australian Legislative Assembly
 Henry Bolton (Australian politician) (1842–1900), Australian politician and brewer
 Sandy Bolton (born 1964), Australian politician

United Kingdom
 Edward Bolton (1592–1659), English-born judge in Ireland
 Henry Bolton (British politician) (born 1963), former leader of the UK Independence Party
 Hugh Bolton (trade unionist) (died 1947), British trade union official
 John Bolton (Haverfordwest MP) (fl. 1555), English politician
 John Bolton (Manx politician) (died 1980), Manx politician and accountant
 Joseph Cheney Bolton (1819–1901), Scottish politician and merchant
 Molly Bolton (1897–1991), British politician
 Norman Bolton (1875–1965), British civil servant in British India
 Robert Bolton (politician) (fl. 1990s), Northern Ireland politician
 Roger Bolton (1947–2006), British trade unionist
 Thomas Bolton (politician) (1841–1906), British politician
 Thomas Henry Bolton (1841–1916), English solicitor and politician
 William Bolton (Lord Mayor), English merchant and Lord Mayor of London in 1866

United States
 Chester C. Bolton (1882–1939), American politician in Ohio; father of Oliver P. Bolton
 Frances P. Bolton (1885–1977), American politician in Ohio; mother of Oliver P. Bolton
 George Washington Bolton (1841–1931), American politician in Louisiana; father of James W. Bolton
 John Bolton (born 1948), 25th United States Ambassador to the United Nations, 27th United States National Security Advisor
 John M. Bolton (1901–1936), American businessman and politician in Illinois
 Oliver P. Bolton (1917–1972), American politician in Ohio; son of Frances P. Bolton and Chester C. Bolton
 Richard J. Bolton (1875–1954), American politician in New York and hotel owner
 Susan R. Bolton (born 1951), American judge in Arizona
 William P. Bolton (1885–1964), American politician in Maryland
 Brandon Ellis Bolton (1999-present), 'Merican

Other
 Cornelius Bolton (died 1829) (1751–1829), Irish landowner and politician
 Ferris Bolton (1853–1937), Canadian politician and farmer in Manitoba
 John Bolton (Canadian politician) (1824–1872), Canadian businessman and political figure in New Brunswick
 Kenneth Bolton (1906–1996), Canadian politician in Ontario

Religion
 Charles Anselm Bolton (c. 1905–c.1970), English priest and professor of history and languages
 Frederick Bolton (1908-1987), Dean of Leighlin from 1963 to 1983
 George Bolton (priest) (1905–1968), Dean of Elphin and Ardagh from 1963 to 1967
 Hugh Bolton (priest) (died 1758), Dean of Waterford from 1723 until his death
 John Bolton (priest) (1665–1724), Dean of Derry from 1700 until his death
 William Bolton (priest), Dean of Ross, Ireland, from 1630 to 1637

Science
 Barry Bolton, English myrmecologist
 Charles Bolton (pathologist) (1870–1947), British physician and pathologist
 Charles Francis Bolton (born 1932), Canadian professor of neurology
 Elmer Keiser Bolton (1886–1968), American chemist
 Henry Carrington Bolton (1843–1903), American chemist and bibliographer of science
 Herbert Bolton (palaeontologist) (1863–1936), British palaeontologist
 James Bolton (1735–1799), English naturalist, mycologist, and illustrator
 John Gatenby Bolton (1922–1993), British-Australian astronomer
 Joseph Shaw Bolton (1867–1946), British physician, pathologist, alienist, neurologist, and professor of medicine
 Lissant Bolton (born 1954), Australian anthropologist
 Malcolm Bolton (born 1946), British soil mechanics engineer and professor
 Reginald Pelham Bolton ((1856–1942), Anglo-American engineer, archaeologist and historian
 Sarah Bolton (physicist), American physicist and university administrator
 Scott J. Bolton, American theoretical and experimental space physicist
 Thaddeus L. Bolton (1865–1948), American psychologist
 Tom Bolton (astronomer) (1943–2021), American-Canadian astronomer
 Werner von Bolton (1868–1912), German chemist and materials scientist

Sports

American football (gridiron)
 Andy Bolton (American football) (born 1954), American gridiron football running back
 Curtis Bolton (born 1995), American gridiron football linebacker
 Harry Bolton (American football) (1919–1986), American gridiron football tackle
 Nathaniel Bolton (born 1968), American gridiron football wide receiver and running back
 Nick Bolton (born 2000), American gridiron football linebacker
 Ron Bolton (born 1950), American gridiron football defensive back and coach
 Scott Bolton (American football) (born 1965), American gridiron football wide receiver

Association football (soccer)
 Arthur Bolton (1912–2001), English footballer
 Clint Bolton (born 1975), Australian football goalkeeper
 Hugh Bolton (footballer) (1879–unknown), Scottish footballer
 Ian Bolton (born 1953), English footballer
 Jack Bolton (1941–2021), Scottish footballer
 James Bolton (footballer) (born 1994), English footballer
 Joe Bolton (footballer) (born 1955), English footballer
 Josh Bolton (born 1984), American soccer player
 Laurie Bolton (1932–2018), English footballer
 Leslie Bolton (1909–1986), Danish footballer
 Luke Bolton (born 1999), English footballer
 Nigel Bolton (born 1975), English footballer
 William Bolton (footballer) ( 1915), English footballer

Australian rules football
 Brendon Bolton (born 1979), Tasmanian coach of Australian rules football
 Charles Bolton (footballer) (1876–1954), Australian rules footballer
 Craig Bolton (born 1980), Australian rules footballer
 Darren Bolton (born 1976), Australian rules footballer
 David Bolton (Australian footballer) (born 1960), Australian rules footballer
 Jude Bolton (born 1980), Australian rules footballer
 Jye Bolton (born 1992), Australian rules footballer
 Mark Bolton (born 1979), Australian rules footballer
 Shai Bolton (born 1998), Australian rules footballer

Baseball
 Cecil Bolton (1904–1993), American baseball first baseman
 Cliff Bolton (1907–1979), American baseball catcher
 Rodney Bolton (born 1968), American baseball pitcher
 Tom Bolton (baseball) (born 1962), American baseball pitcher

Basketball
 Rasir Bolton (born 1999), American basketball player
 Ruthie Bolton (born 1967), American basketball player

Cricket
 Alan Bolton (cricketer) (1939–2003), English cricketer
 Benjamin Bolton (1862–1910), English cricketer
 Bertie Bolton (1893–1964), British cricketer and army officer
 Bruce Bolton (born 1935), New Zealand cricketer
 John Bolton (cricketer) (1881–1935), Australian cricketer
 Nicole Bolton (born 1989), Australian cricketer

Ice hockey
 Hugh Bolton (ice hockey) (1929–1999), Canadian ice hockey player
 Jenny Bolton (born 1992), English ice hockey player

Rugby
 Dave Bolton (1937–2021), British rugby league footballer who also played in Australia
 Phil Bolton (born 1983), American rugby union player
 Reg Bolton (rugby union) (1909–2006), English rugby union player and physician
 Richard Bolton (rugby league) (born 1943), New Zealand former rugby league footballer, manager, and coach
 Scott Bolton (rugby league) (born 1987), Australian rugby league footballer
 Shayne Bolton (born 2000), South African rugby union player
 Wilfred Bolton (1862–1930), English rugby union player
 William Bolton (rugby union) (1851–1896), Scottish rugby union player

Other
 Alan Bolton (darts player), New Zealand darts player
 Andrew Bolton (rower) (born 1980), American lightweight rower
 Andy Bolton (born 1970), English powerlifter and strongman
 Bay Bolton (1705–1736), British Thoroughbred racehorse, also known as Brown Lusty
 Bonner Bolton (born 1987), American rodeo cowboy and fashion model
 Cameron Bolton (born 1990), Australian snowboarder
 Colleen Bolton (born 1957), Australian cross-country skier
 Emmet Bolton (born 1985), Irish player of Gaelic football
 John Bolton (weightlifter) (born 1945), New Zealand light-heavyweight weightlifter
 Lyndon Bolton (1899–1995), British horseman
 Matthew Bolton (born 1979), Australian billiards and snooker player
 Nancye Wynne Bolton (1916–2001), Australian tennis player
 Ryan Bolton (born 1973), American triathlete
 Sam Bolton (born 2002), British ski jumper
 Shae Bolton (born 1989), Australian netball player, later known as Shae Brown
 Toy Bolton (1926–2001), American motorsports driver and team owner in NASCAR

Writing
 Deric Bolton (1908–1993), Scottish poet and research chemist
 Edmund Bolton (c.1575–c.1633), English historian and poet
 Gambier Bolton (1854–1928), English author and photographer
 Guy Bolton (1884–1979), Anglo-American playwright and writer of musical comedies
 Isabel Bolton (born Mary Britton Miller; 1883–1975), American poet and novelist
 Ivy May Bolton (1879–1961), English-American nun and writer
 Joe Bolton (poet) (1961–1990), American poet
 John Bolton (illustrator) (born 1951), British comic and graphic artist
 Ken Bolton (born 1949), Australian poet
 Muriel Roy Bolton (1908–1983), American film and television writer
 Sarah Knowles Bolton (1841–1916), American writer
 Sarah T. Bolton (1814–1893), American poet and women's rights activist
 Sharon Bolton, British author of mystery fiction, published as S. J. Bolton

Other
 Charles B. Bolton (1909–1976), American dentist
 Deirdre Bolton, American journalist and news anchor
 Kerry Bolton (born 1956), New Zealand occultist and far-right activist
 Linda Burnes Bolton, American nurse and healthcare administrator
 Reg Bolton (clown) (1945–2006), English-born clown in the United Kingdom and Australia
 Roxcy Bolton (1926–2017), American feminist and civil rights activist
 Steve Bolton (entrepreneur) (born 1967), British entrepreneur
 Walter James Bolton (1888–1957), New Zealand criminal
 William Robert Fossey Bolton (1905–1973), Australian businessman and philanthropist

Fictional characters 
 Jack Bolton (High School Musical), a character in the 2006 American television film High School Musical
 Jambo Bolton, a character in the British Channel 4 soap opera Hollyoaks
 Kevin Bolton, a character in British soap opera EastEnders
 Michael Bolton, a character from the 1999 American film Office Space
 Ramsay Bolton, a character in the A Song of Ice and Fire series of fantasy novels
 Roose Bolton, a character in the A Song of Ice and Fire series of fantasy novels
 Troy Bolton, a character in the 2006 American television film High School Musical

See also
 Bolten
 Bolton (disambiguation)
 Boulton (surname)

English-language surnames